A timekeeper is an instrument or person that measures the passage of time.

Person
A timekeeper is a person who measures time with the assistance of a clock or a stopwatch. In addition, a timekeeper records time, time taken, or time remaining during events such as sports matches.

Instrument

A timekeeper is often referred to as a time clock, which tracks employee time. Collecting such data gives employers insight into their workforce. They can then make operational decisions to increase productivity and reduce labor costs.

See also

 Atomic clock
 Chess clock
 Fully automatic time
 Horology
 Referee
 Sense of time
 Stopwatch
 Time clock
 Timegrapher
 Timesheet
 Time tracking software

External links
 A Walk Through Time at the National Institute of Standards and Technology
 "Treatise for Observers on Constructing the Circle of Projection" is a manuscript, in Arabic, from 1473, about timekeeping.

Sports occupations and roles
Sports officiating
 

zh:計時器